Alcolea del Río is a municipality in Seville, Spain. In 2005, it had a population of about 3,331.

References

Municipalities of the Province of Seville